The gut-2 RNA motif is a conserved RNA structure that was discovered by bioinformatics.
gut-2 motif RNAs are found in metagenomic sequences that are derived from animal guts.

It is ambiguous whether gut-2 RNAs function as cis-regulatory elements or whether they operate in trans.  Although gut-2 RNAs are often found upstream of protein-coding genes, this does not occur often enough that they were declared as being likely to be cis-regulatory.

References

Non-coding RNA